Dopethrone is a doom metal album by the British band Electric Wizard. It was released on September 25, 2000, by Rise Above Records. Following the release and tour of their previous studio album Come My Fanatics..., the group was asked by Rise Above owner Lee Dorian to create a follow-up. Vocalist and guitarist Jus Oborn has stated that drug issues and other personal problems led to the production of Dopethrone being a "difficult process". The group entered Chuckalumba Studios in May 2000 with only three tracks written: "Dopethrone", "Funeralopolis", and "We Hate You". The album was recorded in three days; members of the group disagreed during the mixing sessions about how the overall record should sound.

The album was released on September 25, 2000. The group went on tour with Sons of Otis in England, followed by a tour in Europe and the group's first performances in the United States. The album was released to positive reviews from Exclaim!,  CMJ New Music Monthly, and The Village Voice. Retrospective reviews continued to be positive, with Decibel placing the album on their list of the "Top 20 Stoner Rock Albums of All Time" in September 2007, and Terrorizer declaring Dopethrone the album of the decade.

Background and production
Following the release of their 1997 album Come My Fanatics..., Sean Palmerston of Exclaim! stated that Electric Wizard became "pretty much invisible". Vocalist and guitarist Jus Oborn  claimed that the music "isn't pop music, where there's commercial pressure to deliver all the time. This is underground metal where, if you're lucky, you might sell one or two copies". Oborn felt that he was pressured by Lee Dorrian, the owner of Rise Above Records, to create a new album. Oborn stated the group all had "drug issues" between the releases of the two albums. Tim Bagshaw, the group's bassist, has said that he was arrested for breaking into a liquor store, and drummer Mark Greening fell off his motorcycle and broke his collarbone. Meanwhile, Oborn was arrested for setting fire to a Reliant Robin. Oborn felt that the difficulties that the band's members experienced in the three years between studio albums were channeled into Dopethrone, and that creating the album was "such a difficult process that it kind of made [life] worse."

Oborn said that the group thrived on jamming, which would occasionally lead to the creation of a song. Prior to entering the studio, only three tracks were written: "Dopethrone", "Funeralopolis", and "We Hate You". Bagshaw said that he wrote "quite a lot of the album", including writing "Vinum Sabbathi" in "about two minutes", along with "I, The Witchfinder", "Golgotha", and "We Hate You". The album's centrepiece, titled "Weird Tales", was created entirely within the studio. On discussing the track's multiple parts, Oborn admitted later declared it "kind of stupid, like prog-rock or some shit." Greening's contribution was hearing what Bagshaw and Oborn had come up with and drumming to it. The album was recorded at Chuckalumba Studios between May and June 2000. Prior to recording each song, Oborn indulged in both cannabis and cocaine; Bagshaw said that the group consumed "copious amounts of weed and booze".

Bagshaw and Greening described the recording sessions as mostly about "getting really stoned" and "quite good fun", respectively. Oborn recalled that the initial recording sessions were about three or four days, with the mixing taking much longer as there were arguments amongst the group members. Oborn argued with producer Rolf Startin about how the album should sound. Two longer tracks, "Weird Tales" and "Dopethrone", were completed in their first and second takes, respectively. Oborn said that "back then we didn't have a way to cut it up and just redo one part." The track "Mind Transferal" was recorded during this session but only released later as a bonus track for Japanese releases of the album.

Music
Greg Kot of the Chicago Tribune said that unlike American stoner rock that drew from punk music, grunge, and heavy metal, the music on Dopethrone was more akin to early 1970s Black Sabbath and the music of Motörhead. Jim DeRogatis of The Chicago Sun noted that the style was primarily known as stoner rock in the United States and "Doom" in the United Kingdom. Greening spoke in 2007 about the Electric Wizard albums he had worked on, saying that "I wanted something with louder drums. I always regret all the Electric Wizard releases, because the drums don't sound loud enough", and that Dopethrone did "not represent the sound I was trying to give off, as with all Electric Wizard releases." Oborn said that the other members of the group wanted to introduce elements of hip hop music and the sound of Nirvana. Oborn later recalled that Bagshaw had been "into some weird shit; he'd listen to Linkin Park and shit like that. Fucking shite. [...] They wanted to put scratching or some shit on one song, and I could've killed them." 

Anthony Bartkewicz of Decibel commented that the Oborn's lyrics  put Dopethrone more in line with death or black metal than Black Sabbath's "hippie-love brother sentiment". Oborn, who wrote all of the album's lyrics, spoke of H. P. Lovecraft and Robert E. Howard as an influence on his own writing, specifically the atmosphere of Lovecraft's work and Howard's "attitude towards society, these anti-civilization rants. That was a big inspiration for me." On specific Lovecraft stories that inspired him, Oborn cited "The Music of Erich Zann" and "The Dreams in the Witch House", with their themes of the occult being carried into music through time signatures. Oborn described the inspiration of the song "Dopethrone" as a story he had heard about someone who owned a couch made entirely of cannabis. "We Hate You" was inspired by Ozzy Osbourne, whom Oborn described as "always going about how much he fucking loved everyone, so we thought it would be great to go and do the opposite."

Release
Dopethrone was released on September 25, 2000, by Rise Above Records. The Music Cartel released the album in the United States via mail order on November 20, 2000. It became available in retail shops in January 2001. The album was reissued in 2004; this version included the bonus track "Mind Transferal". The 2004 reissue of the album also had the track "Dopethrone" edited down from 20 minutes to 10 minutes. When asked about this edit in 2007, Oborn responded that he was unaware that the change had been made.

Following the release of the album, Electric Wizard toured with the group Sons of Otis, initially in England starting on September 27, 2000, followed by shows across Europe, including Switzerland, Germany, Denmark, Sweden, and the Netherlands. The tour concluded with a final show in England on October 22 in Bradford. Following the tour, Electric Wizard did their first tour of the United States, becoming the first band on the Rise Above Records label to tour the country. The tour began on March 4, 2001, and concluded on April 8 with a show at South by Southwest. On the tour, the band predominantly toured with Warhorse, while also performing shows with Bongzilla, Cathedral, and Converge. On March 7, the three members of Electric Wizard were searched and interrogated for possession of illegal substances in Richmond, Virginia. Erik Larson of Alabama Thunderpussy, who were also performing that day, was able to assist the group in getting the police to drop the charges. The band's American label, The Music Cartel, responded to the event, stating that "with a band like Electric Wizard something like this happening wasn't very far off the mark. I just hope nothing worse happens before the tour is completed." Bagshaw reflected on their American tour as like serving in the Vietnam War, saying that it "strengthened their armor". Greening said that the tour "seemed like a good laugh" but that the group was "young at the time [...] at times it was soul destroying." Oborn commented more positively on it, expressing his excitement about touring the United States and "staying at great hotels, being treated like kings", while noting that the group had still argued a lot while on tour.

Reception

From contemporary reviews, CMJ New Music Monthly declared the album to be "for true fans of doom metal, people who don't think Iron Man" rip-off' every time they hear detuned chromatic guitar riffs'. Palmerston of Exclaim! declared it "their best effort yet" and "what might be the most over-the-top, loudest doom album ever made", proclaiming that "whether the band realizes it or not, they have raised the bar by which fuzz/stoner/doom music will be judged." Kot declared the group "one of England's more single-minded bands", finding Oborn's vocals "riotously over-the-top" and the group's interplay "in a word: H-E-A-V-Y."

George Smith of the Village Voice declared that the album was "the doom metal equivalent of the Reinheitsgebot, the German pure-beer standard: bitter and sulfuric to the point of unpalatability, but against which everything else seems watery." At the end of the year, DeRogatis commented on the album, saying "You're forgiven for saying that all of the above sounds a little bit Spinal Tap [...] But that doesn't negate the fact that Electric Wizard is one of the most intense rock bands pounding the boards anywhere in this new millennium". AllMusic's Ed Rivadavia said that with Dopethrone, the group had "raised the bar for doom metal achievement in the new millennium – good luck to the competition."

In a retrospective review, Decibel placed the album on their list of the "Top 20 Stoner Rock Albums of All Time" in September 2007. The album placed second on their list, after Black Sabbath's Master of Reality (1971).  Terrorizer magazine crowned the album as "Album of the Decade" for the 2000s.

Oborn initially said that he had not wanted to listen to the album for a long time and that he was unaware of how the album was received by critics or fans until he began touring to promote it. Bagshaw commented on the album in 2007, saying that he did not care what other people said about the album at the time or at the present. Oborn commented in 2011 that he looked fondly on the album, calling Come My Fanatics… (1997), Supercoven (1998), and Dopethrone "the trilogy of terror", and saying that by the time they got to Dopethrone, the group "knew what was needed, or rather I did!" Anthony Bartkewicz of Decibel, in commenting on the album's legacy, said that it "epitomized doom metal as a lifestyle".

Track listing
All songs performed by Electric Wizard. Lyrics by Jus Oborn.

Credits
Credits adapted from the liner notes of the album. Extra details are from Decibel.
 Jus Oborn – guitar, vocals, effects, lyrics, artwork, design
 Tim Bagshaw – bass, fuzz bass, effects
 Mark Greening – drums (credited as "assault and battery")
 Electric Wizard – performer and "deranger"
 Rolf Startin – mixing, producer
 Josh Stephen – assistant
 Hugh Gilmour – artwork, design, photography
 Tom Bagshaw –  cover art

See also
 2000 in music
 2000 in British music
 2000 in heavy metal music

References

Sources
 
 
 
 
 
 
 
 
 
 

2000 albums
Electric Wizard albums
Rise Above Records albums
Cthulhu Mythos music